A list of Bangladeshi films released in 1983.

Releases

See also

List of Bangladeshi films
Cinema of Bangladesh

References

Film
Lists of 1983 films by country or language
 1983